The Lightning Process (LP) is a three-day personal training programme developed and trademarked by British osteopath Phil Parker. It claims to be beneficial for various conditions, including chronic fatigue syndrome, depression and chronic pain.

Developed in the late 1990s, it aims to teach techniques for managing the acute stress response that the body experiences under threat. The course aims to help recognise the stress response, calm it and manage it in the long term. It also applies some ideas drawn from neurolinguistic programming (a pseudoscience), as well as elements of life coaching.

A clinical trial in 2017 found that Lightning Process was effective when added to treatment for chronic fatigue syndrome, but it is not recommended by the NHS. Two corrections of this article were published due to methodological weaknesses.

The approach has raised some controversy due to using psychological techniques to cure a physical illness. The website was amended after the Advertising Standards Authority ruled that it was misleading. In 2021, after a review of the available evidence, the National Institute for Health and Care Excellence explicitly advised against the use of Lighting Process among patients with chronic fatigue syndrome.

Description
The Lightning Process comprises three group sessions conducted on three consecutive days, lasting about 12 hours altogether, conducted by trained practitioners.

According to its developer, Phil Parker, the programme aims to teach participants about the acute stress response the body experiences under threat. It aims to help trainees spot when this response is happening and learn how to calm it. Techniques based on movement, postural awareness and personal coaching are intended to modify the production of stress hormones. Participants practise a learnt series of steps to habituate the calming method.

The Lightning Process is based on the theory that the body can get stuck in a persistent stress response. The initial stressor may be a viral or bacterial infection, psychological stress, or trauma, which causes physical symptoms due to the body's stress response. These symptoms then act as a further stressor, resulting in overload of the central nervous system and chronic activation of the body's stress response. Neuroplasticity then causes this abnormal stress response to persist and be maintained. The Lightning Process suggests that while this disruption initially happens at an unconscious level, it is possible for the patient to exert conscious control and influence over the process, eventually breaking the cycle.

The rationale for the programme draws on ideas of osteopaths Andrew Taylor Still and J M Littlejohn regarding nervous system dysregulation and addressing clients' needs in a holistic manner rather than focusing solely on symptoms. It also incorporates ideas drawn from neuro-linguistic programming and life coaching. A basic premise is that individuals can influence their own physiological responses in controlled and repeatable ways. Such learnt emotional self-regulation, it is suggested, could help overcome illness and improve well-being, if the method is practised consistently.

Parker advocates attending the training course in order to gain a full understanding of the tools in a safe and supportive context. He also lays emphasis on the trainee playing an active role in recovery (the course is framed as a fully participatory 'training', not a passive 'treatment' or set of answers given to a 'patient'). He claims that the programme has helped to resolve various conditions including depression, panic attacks, insomnia, drug addictions, chronic pain and multiple sclerosis.  The program has also been used with chronic fatigue syndrome.

The Lightning Process is trademarked.

Criticism and support
There has been criticism of the cost of the three-day course. There has also been criticism of the claimed benefits (see also below). John Greensmith, of the British advocacy group ME Free For All, stated "We think their claims are extravagant... if patients get better, they claim the success of the treatment – but if they don't, they say the patient is responsible."

Some chronic fatigue syndrome patient support groups have strongly objected to the perceived implication that the disease has psychological causes. However, the Lightning Process website states that it is a neuro-physiological approach and that it considers CFS/ME to be a physical illness.

Nigel Hawkes writing for The BMJ describes the Lightning Process as being "secretive about its methods, lacks overall medical supervision, and has a cultish quality because many of the therapists are former sufferers who deliver the programme with great conviction" and that "Some children who do not benefit have said that they feel blamed for the failure".

Some people have claimed rapid cures for longstanding illnesses. Prominent advocates of the process include British journalist Patrick Strudwick, French dancer Chris Marques, and singer Laura Mvula.

Advertising Standards Authority ruling
In 2011 Hampshire Trading Standards requested that the UK Advertising Standards Authority (ASA) give a ruling on the website www.lightningprocess.com, arguing that the information on the site was misleading in four areas. ASA upheld two of the four challenges. They concluded that although there seemed to be some evidence of participant improvement during trials conducted, the trials were not controlled, the evidence was not sufficient to draw robust conclusions, and more investigation was necessary; consequently, the website's claims at the time were deemed misleading and was amended.

Research

A registered clinical trial (UK SMILE pilot study) was conducted in England at Bristol University, with results published in 2017. The results did not change the stance of the National Health Services in the United Kingdom which does not recommend the method.

A peer reviewed qualitative study on experiences of the course among a group of young people with chronic fatigue syndrome was published in 2012.
A Norwegian Support Group patient survey showed mixed experiences. Patient surveys are considered low quality evidence compared with peer reviewed studies. For various reasons they cannot answer questions about the results of intervention.

A pilot intervention study exploring the efficacy of the Lightning Process training programme for reducing chronic fatigue and improving health-related quality of life in cancer survivors with reported significant fatigue issues were conducted at the National Cancer Hospital in Norway (Radiumhospitalet) and published in August, 2021. The study involved 13 participants and did not include a control group, which prevents causal attribution of any effect a given treatment may have. Significant improvement was reported at 3 and 6 months compared to baseline. No adverse effects were reported and the authors argued that a larger controlled clinical trial may be recommended.

Given the limited clinical evidence, the National Institute for Health and Care Excellence (NICE) explicitly states that "[d]o not offer the Lightning Process, or therapies based on it, to people with ME/CFS" in their guideline for the management of ME/CFS published in 2021.

Public reaction to research
Esther Crawley said that "I never expected it would work" and that "This is an important study as it provides another treatment approach that some may find helpful. However, while these results are promising, further research is needed to establish which aspects of the process are helpful, whether it is an effective treatment on its own, and whether it could be used to help more severely affected patients."

Research into chronic fatigue syndrome is often a target of criticism. The SMILE study received some public criticism for recruiting children when adult subjects are available. The study was approved by the National Research Ethics Service. The paediatrician supervising the study, Esther Crawley, has commented "If the Lightning Process is dangerous, as they say, we need to find out. They should want to find it out, not prevent research."

Results of the study by Crawley were publicized at the Science Media Centre in September 2017; an editorial on its own presentation of the results of the SMILE study stated: "If you had only read the headlines for the CFS/ME story you may conclude that the treatment tested at Bristol might be worth a try if you are blighted by the illness, when in truth the author said repeatedly that the findings would first have to be replicated in a bigger trial." Reactions to their briefing were stronger than expected: "it was the criticism from within the scientific community that we had not anticipated." The briefing invited four psychologists to make comments on the study, who were mild in their reactions, while the commentary on the 28 September 2017 article evoked detailed, well-referenced but anonymous criticisms of the SMILE study and the Lightning Process in the comments section.

Dorothy Bishop from Oxford University commented that "The gains for patients in this study seem solid. However, while the patient allocation and statistical analysis of the trial appear to be done to a high standard, the intervention that was assessed is commercial and associated with a number of warning signs. The Lightning Process appears based on neurolinguistic programming, which has long been recognised as pseudoscience".

References

Bibliography

External links
Official web site''

Physiology
Mind–body interventions
Devices to alter consciousness
Osteopathic techniques
Chronic fatigue syndrome